

Introduction
Munnasa is a town of Bagh District, Azad Kashmir, Pakistan. It is located on the bank of the Jhelum River. Munasa lies en route from Kohala to Bagh and is situated to the east of the river Jhelum; it is in an area affected by the 2005 earthquake.
There are Many political leaders that belong to Munnasa, Touseef Abbasi work as Media Coordinator in Ministry of Foreign Affairs

References

Populated places in Bagh District